St. Francis Xavier Catholic Church is a parish of the Roman Catholic Church located at Taos, Cole County, Missouri, United States, in the Diocese of Jefferson City. It is noted for its historic parish church and rectory.

History
Fr. Ferdinand Helias came to the area in 1838 to minister to German immigrants who had settled in the area. Shortly thereafter, funds were raised for a church and school. A log church was erected in 1840 and dedicated to St. Francis Xavier. The cornerstone for a permanent stone church was laid on April 6, 1844, and construction was completed the following year.

Under Fr. Helias' successor, Fr. John Gruender, plans were drawn up for new church, as the congregation had outgrown the first rock church. This structure was completed in 1883 and remains in use today.

Architecture
The historic Romanesque Revival style church was built in 1883 of locally made brick and locally quarried stone. It features a centered bell tower with a polygonal steeple that reaches 190 feet in height, containing three bells cast in St. Louis by the Henry Stuckstede Foundry. A thirteen-register pipe organ was installed in 1898.

The rectory was built in 1923. It is a 2½-story, Tudor Revival style with a steeply pitched hipped roof with cross gables. It features bands of narrow windows and some faux half timbering.

The church and rectory were listed on the National Register of Historic Places in 2016.

References

External links
 
 St. Francis Xavier School

Churches on the National Register of Historic Places in Missouri
Romanesque Revival church buildings in Missouri
Tudor Revival architecture in Missouri
Churches completed in 1883
Houses completed in 1923
Churches in Cole County, Missouri
National Register of Historic Places in Cole County, Missouri
Religious organizations established in 1838
Churches in the Roman Catholic Diocese of Jefferson City